Imago KK Times Square Shopping Mall ("Imago") is a one-stop premium shopping mall located at the city centre of Kota Kinabalu, Sabah, Malaysia. It was developed and managed by Syarikat Kapasi Sdn. Bhd., which is a wholly owned subsidiary of Asian Pac Holdings Berhad, a company listed on the Main Board of the Kuala Lumpur Stock Exchange (KLSE:ASIAPAC [4057]).

Imago is a super-regional mall with a total floor space of approximately 1,400,000 sq. ft. (130,000 sq. m.)  and a net retail area of about 800,000 sq. ft. (74,320 sq. m.) of non-stratified lease-only retail space. It spans four levels (basement, ground, first and second floor) and encompasses a complete lifestyle-based trade mix with rich tenant composition of around 300 tenants that covers the entire broad retail spectrum such as departmental store, supermarket, fashion and accessories, electronic gadgets, cinema, indoor kids' playground, bookstore, toys, karaoke, gaming arcade, along with a vast range of dining outlets, cafes and bars.

It attracts more than 18 million visitors every year that covers the local community as well as national and international tourists from all around the world and is one of the most visited shopping mall in Kota Kinabalu and Borneo.

History

Vision 
The mall was first named "KK Times Square Mall". It was then named "Imago" to symbolize the arrival of a proper non-stratified lease-only shopping mall that will have proper trade and tenant mix. This phase was later dubbed the "Vision" phase as in 2012 the mall finally underwent full-scale layout planning, market positioning, branding, trade mix planning, tenant planning, etc.

Reborn 
The first major pre-opening roadshow for Imago was conducted in 2013 in Kuala Lumpur, Malaysia, where the event was named "Reborn" to officially announce its change of name from "KK Times Square Mall" to "Imago". The roadshow event was also to showcase to prospective tenants the potential of the mall and was officiated by Asian Pac Holdings Berhad Board of Directors Chairman, Tan Sri Dato' Seri Hj. Megat Najmuddin Bin Datuk Seri Dr. Hj. Megat Khas.

Metamorphosis 
The second major pre-opening event for Imago was in 2014 named "Metamorphosis", where a signing ceremony with anchor tenants was conducted in Kuala Lumpur, Malaysia, with brands such as Michael Kors, Coach, Parkson, etc. becoming part of Imago's tenant.

Emergence 
One week before Imago was opened, the developer of Imago – Asian Pac Holdings Berhad, together with Malaysia's Unit Kerjasama Awam Swasta (UKAS) of the Prime Minister's Office launched the newly completed 6-lane "New Link Bridge", a public-private partnership (PPP) project that connects Jalan New Link with Jalan Tun Fuad Stephens (to the north-east) and Jalan Coastal (to the south-west) to improve the connectivity of the entire KK Times Square development with Kota Kinabalu's city centre and the rest of the city.

Imago was originally slated to open in late 2014 in time for Christmas. Opening was delayed and it eventually opened on Saturday, 28 March 2015, graced by the then Deputy Chief Minister of Sabah, Yang Berhormat Datuk Raymond Tan Shu Kiah. The launching ceremony was conducted at The Oval (central atrium), ground floor of Imago, and the theme of the event was "Emergence" in line with its name to symbolize the "final phase of transformation into a fully-developed and completed" shopping mall.

Anniversaries 
Imago's subsequent anniversary event continued this tradition of a "single-word" theme:

 Intensification - 2016 (1st Anniversary);
 Ascension - 2017 (2nd Anniversary);
 Exultation - 2018 (3rd Anniversary);
 Transcendence - 2019 (4th Anniversary).
 Anniversary celebrations were interrupted by COVID-19 in 2020.

Management 
The management of Imago is directly under the wholly owned subsidiaries of Asian Pac Holdings Berhad:

 Mall ownership and management: Syarikat Kapasi Sdn. Bhd.;
 Facility management: Asian Pac Property Management Sdn. Bhd.

ISO 
The management of Imago has also successfully adopted internationally recognized standards. Current adopted standards are:

 ISO 9001:2015 Quality Management Systems (QMS);
 ISO 14001: 2015 Environmental Management Systems (EMS).

Location and access

Location 
Imago is part of the larger Kota Kinabalu Times Square ("KK Times Square") development, comprising

 Signature Office;
 The Loft Residence;
 Imago.

The entire development by Asian Pac Holdings Berhad is located in the south-west section of Kota Kinabalu city.

Vehicular access 
Vehicular access to Imago is via Jalan New Link either using Jalan Tun Fuad Stephens from the north-east or Jalan Coastal from the south-west.

Car park and drop-off 
Car park at Imago is split between the following 2 distinct areas:

Basement car park 
Access to Imago's basement car park is via Jalan New Link from the south-west (Jalan Coastal). It is a standalone car park and is connected directly to the basement floor of the mall. There is also an existing connection to Signature Office KK Times Square.

Exit from the car park can be either north-east bound towards Jalan Tun Fuad Stephens or south-west bound towards Jalan Coastal.

Podium car park 
Access to Imago's podium car park is via KK Times Square internal roads. The podium car park is situated on top of the mall with intermediary car parks in between. It spans a total of 3 floors with 3 intermediary floors. Imago shares this car park with The Loft Residence.

Exit from the car park is towards Jalan New Link south-west bound towards Jalan Coastal.

Drop-off 
Passenger drop-off is at the southern part of the mall where entry into the mall is via "South Entrance". Most tour buses, taxis and other ride-sharing vehicles drop their passengers here.

Taxis and Tour Buses 
Taxis and tour buses stop and park at South Plaza of Imago (next to Jalan Coastal) although entry is via Jalan New Link.

Layout and circulation

Layout 
Imago is planned as a T-shaped mall, with a central atrium (called "The Oval") placed at the junction of the "T". The mall also visually identifies the various zones calling them "East Avenue", "West Avenue" and "South Avenue", where the latter is the main spine of the mall as the main entrance and drop-off area is also located at the south of the building. The main-spine and The Oval at ground floor is also where the international luxury brands are located, such as Coach, Michael Kors, Furla and Tory Burch.

Lifts and escalators 
Floors are connected via lifts and escalators. Escalators are the main vertical transportation method in the common area and located at the ends of the "T". Lifts are located in semi-public area along with the toilets.

Trade mix 
Every floor in Imago is designed to meet the different needs of every visitor and to encompass the broad spectrum of the retail industry. The only tenant that spans several floors is a departmental store, Parkson, covering 3 floors (from ground floor to 2nd floor).

Mercato 
Integrating Essential Needs

The basement floor (BF) of Imago was planned to integrate essential needs such as groceries, sundries, electrical appliances, quick dining such as fast food, and other essential daily services and needs. Tenants include Everrise Supermarket, SenQ, Guardian Pharmacy, Caring Pharmacy, Merchantrade (money changer), ATM and major fast food and quick dining outlets such as KFC, Pizza Hut, Burger King, Subway, Hazukido, Big Apple Donut & Coffee, Tealive, llao llao, Royce' and many more

Couture 
Satisfying the Passion for Fashion

The ground floor (GF) of Imago was planned to include international brands especially fashion, fashion accessories such as handbags, cosmetics and skin care. Tenants include Tory Burch, Cortina Watch, Coach, The Body Shop, Michael Kors, Furla, Tumi, Kate Spade, H&M, Uniqlo, Victoria's Secret, Sephora, Jo Malone, La Mer, Swarovski, Pandora, Levi's, Godiva, Hugo Boss, Steve Madden, Calvin Klein, Tommy Hilfiger and others. Sports branding tenants includes Nike, Puma and many more. Food and beverage tenants includes Madam Kwan's, Starbucks, 4Fingers Crispy Chicken, SOULed Out and Happy Cheese Smile.

Fashionista 
Merging High-Street with Chic

This floor was planned for a mix of affordable international brands, national brands and local brands, along with a health and wellness section, concentrating also on fashion, fashion accessories such as handbags among others. Tenants include Sembonia, Carlo Rina, FOS, Brands Outlet, Hush Puppies (shoes), Clarks, Skechers, Ecco, Tissot, DJI, Jelly Bunny, Giordano and others. The health and wellness section includes a nail spa, Thai Odyssey (traditional Thai massage) and others.

Playground 
Creating Amusement & Excitement

This floor was planned to be the amusement, entertainment and digital center of the mall, and covers hobbies and toys along with a food court. Tenants include Golden Screen Cinemas, KMax Karaoke, Molly Fantasy (kids indoor playground), Toy"R"us, LEGO®, Popular Book Store along with major digital equipment brands such as Samsung, Huawei, Switch (Apple), Vivo, Oppo, Sony, Mi, Lenovo, Honor and others.

Special Zones 

There are several zones in Imago that is a smaller part of the entire floor but carries a different emphasis in trade mix or tenant positioning.

Pret-a-Gouter 
“Pret-a-Gouter" is located in the basement floor (BF) of Imago and it is composed of mainly food-related kiosks and outlets. There is a variety of offerings here including freshly cut fruit stalls, ice cream, bubble tea, freshly squeezed fruit juices and even the paper-wrapped nasi lemak (coconut milk rice).

Welcome Point 
"Welcome Point" is located at the ground floor (GF) of Imago in front of the Concierge near South Entrance, which is also the main drop-off point. Traditional cultural performances are conducted every day at regular interval from noon  to 8:00 pm. A common performance that can be seen here is the "Magunatip" bamboo dance, which is a traditional dance of the Murut tribe in Sabah, also commonly found within this region such as in the Philippines.

Aramaiti 
"Aramaiti" is located to the north of the mall at ground floor (GF) of Imago in a semi-outdoor alfresco area also called "Street Walk". The term "aramaiti" is a local Kadazan-dusun language term that means "to celebrate" and is often used locally to toast a drink. It is a part of the mall that is opened till late and includes restaurants and bars such as SOULed Out, Zing Restaurant & Bar as well as the usual cafes such as Starbucks. The area also has a landscaped boulevard with water features for people to rest.

Heritage Food Street 
"Heritage Food Street" can be considered as the only food court in Imago and is located on the second floor (2F). It is designed to a very British colonial-style space similar to the British heritage towns found all across Malaysia. It even uses the marble-top tables and stools commonly found in old Chinese cafes in Malaysia.

Facilities and services 
Imago also provides several facilities for the use of the public or its tenants' staff.

Basement floor (BF) 
 Surau (Muslim Prayer Room);
 Automatic Teller Machines (ATM).

Ground floor (GF) 
 Concierge/Information Counter - Services provided include wheelchairs, baby strollers, gift wrapping, tourist information, luggage locker rental, gift wrapping, printing, first aid and others.
 Luggage Locker;
 First-Aid Room;
 Drivers Rest Area - An area for tour bus drivers, ride-hailing drivers, etc., to rest.

First floor (1F) 
 Charging Station - An area to charge phones and other electronic gadgets.

Second floor (2F) 
Baby Nursing Room - An area provided for the convenience of mothers, where they can nurse in private, diaper-changing facilities, hot water dispenser, etc.;
 Family Toilet - An area provided specifically for families with kids when going to the normal male/female toilet is inappropriate;
 Work Rest Area - An area for tenants' staff to rest akin to a canteen, with microwave ovens, hot water dispenser, etc., provided;
 Charging Station (similar to the one at 1F).

Events and activities 

Imago can be considered as very active in events and activities, especially during the usual Malaysian festive periods such as Chinese New Year, Kaamatan (Harvest Festival), Hari Raya Aidilfitri, Mid-Autumn Festival, Deepavali and Christmas. Imago also turned Halloween into a major event where they have traditionally built haunted houses at the central atrium and shoppers will go into them and find a way to escape.

2015 

 "Emergence" - Opening ceremony of Imago;
 "Imago Fest" - Kaamatan Festival;
 "Salam" - Hari Raya Aidilfitri;
 "Imago Fantasy League" - Online fantasy football competition;
 "The Infirmary" - Halloween;
 "The Purpleblooms" - Christmas.

2016 

 "Monkey Fortune" - Chinese New Year;
 "Intensification" - 1st Anniversary;
 "Incandescence" - Launch of Aramaiti zone; 
 "Rainforest Challenge" - Kaamatan Festival;
 "Salam 2" - Hari Raya Aidilfitri;
 "The Reformatory" - Halloween;
 "Once Upon A Dream" - Christmas/New Year.

2017 

 "A Hail of Phoenix" - Chinese New Year;
 "Ascension" - 2nd Anniversary;
 "Bountiful . Blessed" - Kaamatan Festival/Hari Raya Aidilfitri;
 "Spellbound: The Enchanted Forest" - Bridal Fair;
 "The Playground" - Halloween;
 "The Odyssey" - Christmas/New Year.

2018 

 "Fortuitous Windfall" - Chinese New Year;
 "Exultation" - 3rd Anniversary;
 "Wondrous Serenity" - Kaamatan Festival/Hari Raya Aidilfitri;
 "Eternal Wish" - Mid-Autumn Festival;
 "The Lighthouse" - Halloween;
 "Diwali" - Deepavali;
 "Bedazzled" - Christmas/New Year;

2019 

 "Celestial Fortune" - Chinese New Year;
 "Transcendence" - 4th Anniversary;
 "Hope" - Video Contest;
 "The Divine" - Kaamatan Festival/Hari Raya Aidilfitri;
 "Eden of Prosperity" - Mid-Autumn Festival;
 "Prismatic Light" - Deepavali;
 "The Castle" - Halloween;
 "Imago Super League" - Imago indoor football competition;
 "Clarity" - Christmas/New Year.

2020 

 "Prosperous Journey" - Chinese New Year;
 "Benevolence: - 5th Anniversary;
 "Devotion: Eternal Faith. Forever Love" - Christmas/New Year.

2021 
 "Fortitude" - 6th Anniversary.

2022 
 "Happy Chinese New Year 2022" - Chinese New Year;
 "Regeneration" - 7th Anniversary;
 "Luminescence" - Kaamatan Festival/Hari Raya Aidilfitri;
 "Full Moon Rises" - Mid-Autumn Festival;
 "Demon Storm" - Halloween;
 "Resplendence" - Christmas/New Year.

2023  
 "Hops Of Fortune" - Chinese New Year;
 "Resurgence" - 8th Anniversary.

Awards and accolades 
Imago has received several awards and won mall-related competitions at local and international levels.

2016  
 Asia Pacific International Property Awards (IPA) in association with The Telegraph: 2016–2017 Best Retail Development (Malaysia);
 Asia Pacific International Property Award (IPA) in association with The Telegraph: 2016–2017 Best Retail Architecture (Malaysia).

2017 
 Sabah Tourism Awards: 2017 Best Shopping Complex;
 Shopping Mall Association of Malaysia (PPKM): Best Experiential Marketing 2017 Category B Gold Award (Christmas 2016 – Once Upon A Dream).

2018 
 Shopping Mall Association of Malaysia: Best Experiential Marketing 2018 Category B Gold Award (Christmas 2017 – The Odyssey).
Malaysia Book of Records: Tallest Rotating Christmas Tree (Christmas 2018 - Bedazzled).

2019 
 Sabah Tourism Awards: 2019 Best Shopping Experience.

Corporate social responsibility

Hope Express 
Imago started a charity initiative in line with its “Once Upon A Dream” Christmas event in December 2016. The charity campaign called “Hope Express” involves an indoor train ride around the mall at second floor (2F). Instead of charging a fare to take a ride, people are encouraged to make a donation of any amount. The collection is then donated in full to a charity organisation, while Imago takes care of the maintenance, upkeep and overhead costs of operating the train. The following organisations have benefited from Hope Express:

 Taman Didikan Kanak-Kanak Kurang Upaya (Education Home for Disabled Kids);
 Seri Mengasih Center;
 Sabah Cheshire Home;
 World Wildlife Fund for Nature (WWF);
 Rumah Kanak-Kanak Bondulu Gereja Katolik Toboh Tambunan (Toboh Tambunan Catholic Church Home for Disabled Kids).

Earth Hour 
Imago celebrated Earth Hour every year since its opening in 2015. Together with participating tenants of the mall, essential lighting are switched off during the period in order to create awareness about environmental issues.

Sponsorship 
Imago also carried out many sponsorship programs with charitable organisations and government agencies especially on blood donation campaigns, awareness campaigns, cultural promotions, etc. These organisations and agencies include:

 United Nations Educations, Scientific and Cultural Organization (UNESCO);
 Sabah Tourism Board;
 Queen Elizabeth Hospital, Kota Kinabalu, Sabah, Malaysia;
 Royal Malaysia Police
 Kota Kinabalu City Hall
 Consulate General of The People's Republic of China (Kota Kinabalu).

See also 
 List of shopping malls in Malaysia

References 

Shopping malls in Sabah